El Kenissia is a locality in Tunisia, North Africa.

See also
Louis Carton

References

Roman towns and cities in Tunisia
Ancient Berber cities
Archaeological sites in Tunisia
Catholic titular sees in Africa